Limpopo WMA, or Limpopo Water Management Area (coded: 1), in South Africa includes the following major rivers: the Limpopo River, Matlabas River, Mokolo River, Lephalala River, Mogalakwena River, Sand River and Nzhelele River and covers the following dams.

Cross Dam, Nwanedi River
 Doorndraai Dam Sterk River 
 Glen Alpine Dam Mogalakwena River
Luphephe Dam, Luphephe River
 Mokolo Dam Mokolo River 
 Mutshedzi Dam Mutshedzi River 
Nwanedi Dam, in the Nwanedi River
 Nzhelele Dam Nzhelele River

Boundaries 
Tertiary drainage regions A41, A42, A50, A61 to A63, A71, A72 and A80.

See also 
 Water Management Areas
 List of reservoirs and dams in South Africa
 List of rivers of South Africa

References 

Water Management Areas
Dams in South Africa